Larissa França Maestrini (born April 14, 1982) is a beach volleyball player from Brazil. She is the all-time leader of beach volleyball titles, with 57 FIVB career gold medals, including the 2011 Beach Volleyball World Championships with Juliana Felisberta and the 2015 FIVB Beach Volleyball World Tour with Talita Antunes.

Career
With Felisberta, França won two Pan American Games titles (in 2007 and 2011) and the bronze medal at the 2012 Summer Olympics. Four years prior, França had had to play the 2008 Summer Olympics with Ana Paula Connelly following an injury to Felisberta, finishing in fifth place. She also won the bronze medal at the 2003 Pan American Games in Santo Domingo, Dominican Republic, partnering Ana Richa.

After a brief two year retirement following the 2012 Olympics, França went back to activity in 2014 in a double with Talita Antunes. The duo went on to win the gold medal at the 2015 Swatch FIVB World Tour Finals and earn a spot into the 2016 Summer Olympics.

The pair participated in the 2016 Summer Olympics in Rio. The pair won their quarterfinal match against the Swiss team of Joana Heidrich and Nadine Zumkehr in a nail biting match of three sets (21-23, 27–25, 15-13) in the quarter final played on August 14, 2016.

The pair lost in straight sets to Ludwig and Walkenhosrt in the semifinal match. Next they went for bronze. They lost to the American team of April Ross and Kerri Walsh Jennings in 3 sets of (21–17, 17–21, 9–15); they finished 4th.

Personal life
França was born in Cachoeiro de Itapemirim, Espírito Santo, and moved at a young age to the state of Pará. A sports enthusiast from her youth, she earned a volleyball scholarship in high school and went on to start her professional career at Tuna Luso Brasileira. She moved to beach volleyball in 2001, following an event held by the Brazilian Volleyball Confederation in Fortaleza.

In August 2013, França married fellow female player Liliane Maestrini, about one month after they came out about their relationship.

References

External links
 
 
 
 
 
 

1982 births
Living people
Brazilian women's beach volleyball players
Women's beach volleyball players
Beach volleyball players at the 2008 Summer Olympics
Beach volleyball players at the 2012 Summer Olympics
Olympic beach volleyball players of Brazil
Olympic medalists in beach volleyball
Olympic bronze medalists for Brazil
Medalists at the 2012 Summer Olympics
Beach volleyball players at the 2003 Pan American Games
Beach volleyball players at the 2007 Pan American Games
Beach volleyball players at the 2011 Pan American Games
Pan American Games gold medalists for Brazil
Pan American Games bronze medalists for Brazil
Lesbian sportswomen
Brazilian LGBT sportspeople
LGBT volleyball players
Brazilian people of Portuguese descent
Brazilian people of Catalan descent
Sportspeople from Pará
People from Espírito Santo
Federal University of Rio de Janeiro alumni
Beach volleyball players at the 2016 Summer Olympics
Pan American Games medalists in volleyball
Beach volleyball defenders
FIVB World Tour award winners
Medalists at the 2011 Pan American Games